Kill Sadie (also Killsadie) was a Minneapolis-based post-hardcore band active from 1997 to 2001. The band adopted the DIY ethic of constant touring, rather than other forms of promotion. Several members of the band went on to perform with better known emo, hardcore, and indie bands including Minus the Bear, Pretty Girls Make Graves and These Arms Are Snakes.

History
The band formed in 1997 in the Twin Cities area (Minneapolis/St. Paul) of Minnesota. They departed from their roots in the hardcore scene to experiment with adding sonic presence, electronic beats and sampling, as well as multi-layered vocals, and their sound ranged from soft ethereal jazz to screaming hardcore.

The band's name was taken from an incident at a party. Drummer Erin Tate was told by his brother Knol (guitarist) that a girl named "Sadie tried to kill [him]". Tate responded that "someone should kill Sadie". The band's name can be rendered as two words ("Kill Sadie") or combined into a single word.

They band eventually disbanded due to a relocation from Minneapolis to Seattle, as well as disagreements about the future direction of the band.

Members

Killsadie's lineup changed several times due to touring and internal conflict.

 Erin Tate - drums (Spring 1997-Fall 2001) later of Onalaska/Askeleton/Minus the Bear
 J. Clark - guitar (Summer 1997-Fall 2001) later of Sharks Keep Moving, Pretty Girls Make Graves, Jaguar Love and KT 88
 Steve Snere - vocals (Spring 1999-Fall 2001) later of These Arms are Snakes/Crypts
 Patrick Scott - guitar/vocals (Fall 1999-Fall 2001) later of V.Reverse, My Lai, Locks, 97-Shiki and Unur
 Cory Murchy - bass (Winter 2001-Fall 2001) later of Minus the Bear and Onalaska
 Andy Wolff - roadie/honorary member (Spring 1997 - Spring 2000)
 Rebecca Dunbar - keyboard (Summer 2001-Fall 2001)
 Bruce J Wuollet - guitar (Spring 1999-Fall 1999) later of Themes, The Stereo, Animal Chin, KT 88 and End Transmission
 Bob Eisenbise - bass (Spring 1997-Fall 2000) later of Blackthorne, Chibalo, KT 88, and Shotgun Monday
 Josh VanLoon - vocals (January 1997-Winter 1998)
 Jason Aronen - vocals (Spring 1997-Fall 1997) later of The Real Enemy and Hope You Choke
 Erik Hanson - guitar (Spring 1997-Summer 1997) later of Flickr, The Stereo, Attention, and Amp 176
 Knol Tate - guitar (Spring 1997-Fall 1999) later of Askeleton, Hidden Chord and Deleter.

Discography
 Traitor (album)|Traitor 7"/CD (One Percent Records, 1998)
 Kill Sadie (album)|Kill Sadie EP (THD Records, 1998)
 Half Cocked Concepts 10" (Old Glory Records, 1998)
 In Half Cocked Concepts CD (includes THD 7") (One Percent Records, 1999)
 Split 7" with Brand New Unit (Modern Radio, 2000)
 A New Make 7" (Redwood Records, 2000)
 Experiments in Expectation LP/CD (Dim Mak Records, 2001)
 We're All a Little Sick CD Remixes B-Sides (Satellite City, 2004)

Promo pics

External links
Killsadie in bands section on Modern Radio
Kill Sadie - BandToBand.com

Musical groups from Minnesota
Musical groups established in 1997
Musical groups disestablished in 2001
American post-hardcore musical groups